DoReMi Market, also known as Amazing Saturday, is a South Korean variety show that airs every Saturday at 19:40 (KST) on tvN. From January 17, 2022, the program is available for streaming on Viu every Monday, starting from episode 195.

Program
In each episode, a market from South Korea is featured and within it there are three types of food selected as its representatives. The cast and guest(s) have to play games and win to be able to enjoy the food. There will be a dressing theme concept for the cast and guest(s) to follow for filming of each episode.

For episodes 1–4, the program format is only three rounds of song dictation. From episode 5, the program format changed to two rounds of song dictation, with a Snack Time in between the dictation segments.

Games played
Song Dictation: Viewers can recommend songs (and the specific parts of the songs) through a Google Form for use in the show. The cast and guest(s) have to work together to note down all the correct lyrics that was being sung in a small part of the song chosen to play. For each song, they will be given only three attempts to get all the correct lyrics. For every failed attempt, the food will be consumed by Mukbang YouTuber Small-mouthed Haetnim.
 On failing the first attempt, the amount of the food to be shared by the cast and guest(s) would be cut by half.
 On failing the second attempt, the amount of the food to be shared would be cut to only 1-2 servings.
 If they have completely failed, no food would be given.
For each attempt, a representative from the cast and guest(s) would go up and present their final answer, and if the answer is wrong, the representative gets the popcorn punishment.

Chances are available for use on all three attempts, with only the basic chances on the first attempt, and the chances from the Chance Board on the second and third attempts. On the second and third attempts, after using a chance, the part of the song is played again. The same chance cannot be used twice in the same round. Starting episode 201, for every episode, the chances from the Chance Board that were used in the first round cannot be used in the second round.

 Basic Chances (given on the first attempt):
 One Shot (for the cast member(s)/guest(s) who jotted down the closest answer to the correct answer on the first listen)
 Number of words
 Song information
 Lyrics before and after the part used (in some songs, either of the two or both would not be revealed due to it being possibly a critical hint to the correct lyrics)
 Number of English words (and words from non-Korean languages) and numbers
 Other Chances:
 Listen Again Chance: The part of the song is repeated again. This chance can only be used once for every episode, either in Song 1 or Song 2. Beginning episode 148, this chance can be carried forward to the next episode if unused, leading to more times this chance can be used.
 Food Research Director's 2nd Round Food Introduction: During the first attempt of the episode's first round of song dictation, Park Na-rae deduces the snack for Snack Time and the food for the episode's second round of song dictation, based on the analysis of the episode's market introduction video. This segment is important in deciding whether to use the Listen Again Chance in the first or second round of song dictation, as it is a chance that can only be used once per episode.
 Last Place's Listen Again Chance: Similar to the Listen Again Chance, in which it can only be used once for every episode, but this chance is only for the last place in one shot on the first attempt of the song dictation. If there are two or more people who are in last place and one of them is a guest, then the guest will get the chance. If the last place is shared by the cast members, the person who has the less cumulative number of one shots will get the chance. This chance was added in episode 201.
 Chance Board (for only the second and third attempts):
 All Spaces: All the spaces for the lyrics will be shown.
 One Word: A word of the lyrics (that is requested) will be shown.
 Two Consonants: The initial consonants of two words of the lyrics (that are requested) will be shown. This chance was introduced in episode 54.
 Number of Wrong Words: The number of wrong words will be shown. This chance was introduced in episode 6. This chance was modified for only episodes 244-245, where the number of correct words would be shown instead.
 Slow (70%) Hearing: The song will be played at 70% of the normal playback speed. This chance was introduced in the second round in episode 46, where it temporarily replaced All Spaces. It became a fixed chance starting episode 54.
 Random Hint: In every episode, this hint provided by Boom would be randomised. This chance was introduced in episode 237, replacing Fool Fool Boom Fool.
 Boom-casso: Boom would draw out one line of the lyrics (that is requested) in 20 seconds. (episode 237)
 Rose of Boom Has Bloomed: In the rhythm of Red Light, Green Light, Boom reveals one line of the lyrics (that is requested) in three poses. (episode 238)
 View View Boom View: Boom would mouth out five consecutive words of the lyrics (that are requested), and the cast members and guests would use their magnifying glasses to look at Boom's mouth shape. (episode 239)
 No~ Boom Teeth: Boom would read out five consecutive words of the lyrics (that are requested) in a way that his teeth cannot be seen when saying out. (episode 241, 248)
 Shake It Boom Fool: This chance is similar to Fool Fool Boom Fool, but the difference being if Boom answers "yes" to the first question, a second question can be asked, and if Boom answers "no" to the first question, there would not be a second question asked. (episode 242, 249)
 Shake The Boom Butt: Boom would write out two consecutive words of the lyrics (that are requested) with his butt. (episode 243, 247)
 Boom Come And Go: Boom would move the pointer to and fro on the hand-drawn Chance Board with the other five chances and Fool Fool Boom Fool, and when he hears "Stop", the chance at which Boom's pointer stops at would be provided. This chance is a mandatory chance in the first attempt of the dictation on episodes 244 and 245.
 Troublemaker Boom: Boom would reveal the final consonants of two words of the lyrics (that are requested). (episode 246)
 Matured Boom: Boom would show two words of the lyrics (that are requested) through the Iron Delivery Case game. (episode 250)
 Boom Power Station: Boom would write four consecutive words of the lyrics (that are requested) on a pinwheel, then turn it in front of the cast members for them to attempt to see while the music is played. (episode 251)
 Hello It's Boom: Boom would reveal four consecutive words of the lyrics (that are requested) to one of the guests through a paper cup phone. (episode 252)
 Matured Part-timer: Similar to Matured Boom, instead of Boom holding the iron delivery case, a guest would hold it and the rest of the cast and guests figure out the two words of the lyrics (that are requested) (episode 254).
 Electric Boom Eel: Boom would reveal three consecutive words of the lyrics (that are requested) through a voice-modulated microphone. (episode 255)
 Other/Discontinued Chances:
 Boom Car Service: This chance can only be used on the third attempt. This is a descriptive chance, where Boom makes the smooth sound of the car on the parts that are correctly answered, and then makes the sound of the car crashed on the wrong part of the lyrics answered.
 Acting Chance: Boom acts to describe the lyrics of the song.
 Live Chance: The live version of the song used is played.
 Two Vowels: Vowels of two words of the lyrics (that are requested) will be shown. This chance has been removed as of episode 89.
 1/5 Seconds: All the words of the lyrics are quickly shown for only 0.2 seconds. This chance was introduced in episode 89. As there is a high success rate after using this chance, starting from episode 95, after using this chance, there is no listening to the part of the song again. This chance has been removed as of episode 135, but had briefly returned for the second round in episode 192.
 Fool Fool Boom Fool: Only one question, of any content about the lyrics, can be asked to Boom, and he can only answer yes or no. This chance was introduced in episode 89. This chance was then added into the Chance Board beginning episode 201, not becoming the basic chance provided in the first attempt. This chance has been removed as of episode 237.
 One-time Chances:
 All Consonants: All the initial consonants to the words of the lyrics were revealed. This chance was provided in the first song of episode 88.
 Half-half Hint: The consonant of one word and the spaces of only one sentence were revealed. This chance was provided in the first song of episode 143, and was suggested by Kim Dong-hyun.
 Arm Wrestling Listen Again Chance: This listen again chance would be provided to the winner of the arm wrestling match between Moon Se-yoon and KCM. This chance was provided in the first song of episode 242.
 Talent Listen Again Chance: This listen again chance would be provided to the team with the winner of the talent showcasing between 3 representatives. This chance was provided in episode 245.

A second version of song dictation was introduced in episode 225, where it was played as a team match between two teams. Additional rules were put in place for only this version.
 The first team to get all the correct lyrics in three attempts wins the food. It would be a tie if both teams get all the correct lyrics in the same attempt.
 After the failing of the first and second attempts, in the case of the two teams wanting to use different chances, there would be a mini game played between the two teams, and the winning team can decide which chance to use for all.

A third version of song dictation was introduced in episode 244, where it was played as a team relay with three teams. Additional rules were put in place for only this version.
 For episode 244, the top 3 in cumulative number of one shots (bottom 3 for episode 245) would be the leaders of their own teams and would each choose their team members.
 There are three lines to dictate, with each team taking one line. Each team has six attempts to note down the correct lyrics of their own line, with the team(s) with the fewest attempts getting to eat the food first, and only the last team would not get to eat the food. After the first team's success, if the remaining two teams succeeded on the same attempt, the food would be provided to both teams.
 As there would be six attempts provided, there would be no Listen Again Chance and Last Place Listen Again Chance, but each team can choose a chance of their choice on the Chance Board on every attempt beginning the second attempt (Random Hint was already provided in the first attempt).

Snack Time: Different from the Song Dictation segment, this is an individual battle where only the last placing cast member/guest would not get the snack.
New/Old Neologism Quiz: Answer the full phrase of the Korean neologism that is given as question.
North Korean Cultural Quiz: Answer the word/sentence, which is said in North Korean dialect, in South Korean dialect.
New/Old OST Quiz: Answer the correct name of the movie/drama/animation based on its original soundtrack.
What is This Food?: Answer the correct food based on its close-up.
Voice Support Quiz: Answer the correct line(s) based on a capture of a drama/movie/advertisement/variety show/comedy.
Your Eyes, Nose, Lips Quiz: Answer the correct celebrity based on separate pictures of his/her eyes, nose and lips.
Consonants Quiz: Answer the correct term based on its initial consonants. Normally, there is a specific common theme for the questions. For the Songs version, the correct song name and its singer has to be answered.
Love Love Couple Quiz: Answer the other half of the couple based on one half of the couple from a drama/movie/animation/webtoon being shown.
Find The Fan Club Owner: Answer the correct celebrity based on the fan club name given as question.
New/Old Game BGM Quiz: Answer the correct game name based on its background music or sound effects. The game can be of an online game or a mobile phone game.
Translator Quiz: Answer the correct term/sentence that was originally being said through an online translator, which has a foreign accent.
Dictionary Battle: Answer the correct term based on its definition from the Standard Korean Language Dictionary.
Lyrics Reading Quiz: Answer the correct singer and the song title from listening to its lyrics being read out in a consistent tone.
Doppelganger Quiz: Answer the two (or 3) correct drama/movie titles based on the captures of the same actor/actress in the dramas/movies given as question. There is also a Singers version and a Variety version of this game.
Dialect Tour: Answer the correct song title and its singer based on one of the Eight Provinces of Korea dialect translations for the song title given as question.
I Can See Your Title: Answer the correct movie or drama title based on its promotional poster.
Find The Original Singer: Answer the song name and the original singer from listening to a cover or remake version of the song.
Face/Off: Answer the correct celebrity based on a picture of him/her which has the gender of the celebrity swapped.
Find The Hidden Real Name: Answer the correct celebrity based on his/her real name given as question.
Noraebang Accompaniment Quiz: Answer the correct song title and its singer based on the Noraebang accompaniment of the song.
Character Expression Quiz: Answer the correct celebrity based on the title or nickname used to express him/her.
Choreography Décalcomanie Quiz: Answer the two (or 3) correct singers/groups and the two (or three) songs based on two (or three) photos of a similar choreography or movement.
Relation Between The Two?: Answer the correct relation between two people in a movie/drama/animation.
What's Your Name?: Answer the correct name of the person/thing based on a picture of it. There is also a Choreography version of the game, in which the correct name of the dance and the correct song name would have to be answered instead.
Lyrics Feeling Drama Quiz: Answer the correct song title and its singer from listening to its lyrics being read out like drama lines. This is also known as the opposite version of the Lyrics Reading Quiz.
Guess Them Right! Homes: Answer the correct movie/drama/animation/variety show based on a picture of the house or the interior of the house.
Gag Corner Title Quiz: Answer the correct name of the corner of a gag program based on a scene of it.
Who Are Today's First Place Nominees?: Answer the correct song names (either two or three of them) based on the first place nominees announcement of a music show from the past or from the present.
Guess The Debut Song: Answer the singer/group's name along with the correct name of his/her/their debut song based on the picture of the singer/group.
Find The Source of This Meme: Answer the correct name of the source (drama/reality show/variety show) based on the meme shown as question.
Guess The First Winning Song: Answer the singer/group's name along with the correct name of the song that has given the said singer/group his/her/their first music show win based on the picture of the singer/group.
Who Is Today's Ending Fairy?: Answer the singer/group's name along with the correct name of the song based on the picture of the singer/group/group member's ending shot of his/her/their stage performance in a music show.
Singing Scene Quiz: Answer the correct song title and its singer based on a still cut (from a drama/movie) of someone singing.
Music Show MC Ment Quiz: Answer the singer/group's name along with the correct name(s) of the song(s) based on the MC's introduction of the song(s) before the performance in a music show.
Music Video Scene Quiz: Answer the correct song title and its singer based on a picture of the song's music video.
Sing It Line by Line: For each round, a keyword is given, and the team with all their members singing a line of a song with the keyword and naming the song that was sung wins the round. The team with two rounds won out of three wins the snack. This is the show's first snack game played in teams, instead of playing individually.
Lyrics in the Square Quiz: Answer the correct lyrics in the empty square based on the lyrics showed on the screen.
Sub Title Quiz: Answer the correct song title (in Korean) and its singer based on its English title or other title.
Director Quiz: Answer the question that was created by Park Sung-jae, the director of the tvN Variety Section.
Guess The Alter Ego: Answer the correct name of the alter ego based on a picture of him/her.
Half-Half Lyrics Quiz: Answer the two correct song titles based on their lyrics that have been combined.

Cast

Current

Former

Timeline

Changes to the cast
Nucksal and P.O joined the show starting from episode 52 to replace Hanhae and Key, who were confirmed to enlist in the army on February 7 and March 4, 2019, respectively. Hanhae and Key officially left after episode 47 and episode 51 respectively, following military enlistments.

On October 20, 2020, tvN confirmed that Hyeri will be leaving the show, with her last episode expected to be in late November. In addition, Hanhae and Key were confirmed to return to the show, and Taeyeon will also join the show. Hyeri officially left after episode 134, while Hanhae and Key returned as fixed cast members in the same episode. Taeyeon joined the show from episode 135.

On February 10, 2022, it was confirmed that P.O will enlist in the Republic of Korea Marine Corps on March 28. P.O left the show after episode 208, following his military enlistment.

Background music
Each member has their own background music played during different segments of the program. Before the introduction of the Market, the BGM is "Very Nice" by Seventeen. It is usually followed by the guest's songs when the food or snack is shown. During the usage of the Fool Fool Boom Fool chance, "Twit" by Hwasa is being played as its BGM.

Episodes

One Shots
A One Shot is given to the cast member/guest who has jotted down the closest answer to the correct answer on the first listen, only on the first attempt of the song dictations. This is usually calculated by the number of correct characters (in Hangul) written down in comparison to the correct answer. While the One Shot is usually given to one person, there were instances where a tie between two or more people occurs; in this case, the people who got the highest number of correct characters will share the "One Shot".

The cast member(s) or guest(s) who got a One Shot are as listed:

(Names in bold are the guests of the episodes.)

One Shot statistics (Cast members only)
As of episode 255, the statistics for the one shots received by cast members are as listed:

One Shot Hall of Fame
The guests who got one shots in both rounds of song dictation in an episode would be placed in the Hall of Fame. If the guests are of a same group, and the member(s) of the group got one shots in both rounds of song dictation in an episode, the group would be placed in the Hall of Fame. As of episode 254, only nine guests are placed in the Hall of Fame, as listed:

Perfect Game
A Perfect Game happens when the cast and the guests succeed both song dictation rounds in their first attempts. The term "Perfect Game" was first used and seen in the editors' caption in Episode 14, following the first attempt successes in both rounds of song dictation. As a result of these episodes, Haetnim was unable to eat anything, thus the term "perfect".

As of episode 253, there have been ten perfect games, as listed:

Snack Time
The cast member(s) or guest(s) who won the snack first and last, and the cast member/guest who failed to win the snack from the Snack Time game are as listed:

(Names in bold are the guests of the episodes.)

Ratings

2018

2019

2020

2021

2022

2023

Spin-off – Idol Dictation Contest
A web television spin-off of the program titled Idol Dictation Contest (아이돌 받아쓰기 대회) aired from May 21 until June 11, 2021, with videos totaling up to an episode released on Fridays at 15:00 (ST) for four weeks on TVING.  It is known as the Idol version of the program. The spin-off stars Boom and Small-mouthed Haetnim as the non-playing cast members, together with Eunhyuk (Super Junior), Lee Jin-ho, Jaejae, Ravi (VIXX), Kai (EXO), Mijoo (Lovelyz), Lee Jang-jun (Golden Child), Seungkwan (Seventeen) and Choi Ye-na. The spin-off is slightly different from the main program, as it features only one round of song dictation and one Dessert Time game in each episode.

The show returned for Season 2, with Kai, Seungkwan and Lee Jang-jun not returning and Lee Know (Stray Kids) joining the show as a new cast member. In addition, there are idol guests appearing for this season. Each 3-part episode will be released on Thursday at 16:00 (KST) for six weeks on TVING from December 16, 2021.

The spin-off also introduced new games only for the spin-off:
 CM Song Quiz: Answer the correct brand based on its commercial song.
 Caption Quiz: Answer the correct caption based on a capture of a variety show.
 Album Jacket Quiz: Answer the singer/group's name along with the correct name of the title song based on the picture of the singer/group's album cover.
 Silhouette Quiz: Answer the correct song title and its singer based on the silhouette of the song's choreography.
 Boom's Broadcast Dance Academy: Answer the correct song title and its singer based on the step-by-step descriptions of the dance said out by Boom.

Season 1

Episodes
 – Success on first attempt
 – Success on second attempt
 – Success on third attempt
 – Failed

One Shots
The cast member(s) who got a One Shot (meaning that this cast member has jotted down the closest answer to the correct answer on the first listen, only on the first attempt of the song dictation) are as listed:

Dessert Time
The cast members who won the dessert first and last, and the cast member who failed to win the dessert from the Dessert Time game are as listed:

Season 2

Episodes
 – Success on first attempt
 – Success on second attempt
 – Success on third attempt
 – Failed

One Shots
The cast member(s) who got a One Shot (meaning that this cast member has jotted down the closest answer to the correct answer on the first listen, only on the first attempt of the song dictation) are as listed:

(Names in bold are the guests of the episodes.)

Dessert Time
The cast members who won the dessert first and last, and the cast member who failed to win the dessert from the Dessert Time game are as listed:

(Names in bold are the guests of the episodes.)

Awards and nominations

Notes

References

External links

2020s South Korean television series
South Korean music television shows
South Korean game shows
South Korean variety television shows
2018 South Korean television series debuts
TVN (South Korean TV channel) original programming
Korean-language television shows
Musical game shows
Food and drink television series
Television series by SM C&C